DWDO (102.5 FM), broadcasting as Heart FM 102.5, is a radio station owned and operated by the Armed Forces of the Philippines through its Civil Affairs Group. The station's studio and transmitter are located at Brgy. 1, San Jose, Occidental Mindoro.

References

Radio stations in Mindoro